Gao Tianyu (born 20 January 2001) is a Chinese footballer currently playing as a forward or midfielder for Zhejiang Professional F.C..

Club career
Gao Tianyu would play for the Zhejiang youth team before joining third tier Japanese football club Iwate Grulla Morioka. He would go on to be promoted to their senior team where he made his professional debut in a league game on 1 December 2019 against Thespakusatsu Gunma in a 1-0 defeat. This would be his only appearance for the club after they allowed him to leave once his contract expired, which saw Gao return to Zhejiang. He would make his debut in a league game against Suzhou Dongwu on 29 September 2021, in a game that ended in a 3-0 victory. He would then go on to establish himself as a regular as the club gained promotion to the top tier at the end of the 2021 campaign.

Career statistics

References

External links

1997 births
Living people
Chinese footballers
Chinese expatriate footballers
China youth international footballers
Association football forwards
J3 League players
Zhejiang Professional F.C. players
Iwate Grulla Morioka players
Chinese expatriate sportspeople in Japan
Expatriate footballers in Japan